Alice Ekka (Hindi: एलिस एक्का) (8 September 1917 – 5 July 1978) was an Indian Adivasi writer known to be the first female storyteller from a tribal background.

Ekka was born in Ranchi on 8 September 1917, and was from the Munda community. She was the first tribal woman in Jharkhand to graduate in English, in 1938 at the Scottish Church College in Calcutta.

She wrote stories in Hindi, publishing in the 1950s, 1960s and 1970s. A collection of her stories, Alice Ekka Ki Kahaniyan, edited by Vandna Tete, (Radhakrishna Prakashan) was published posthumously in 2015.

Her  stories in the 1960s were published in the weekly magazine Adivasi Patrika. 

She is described as "India's first female tribal storyteller", and the centenary of her birth was celebrated with a two-day conference, the "All India Tribal Women Writer's Meet", held in her home town of Ranchi.

References

1917 births
Munda people
Women writers from Jharkhand
People from Simdega district
20th-century Indian writers
20th-century Indian women writers
Adivasi writers
Adivasi women writers
Hindi-language writers
1978 deaths
Scottish Church College alumni
University of Calcutta alumni